Ryticaryum is a genus of flowering plants belonging to the family Icacinaceae. They are dioecious shrubs or small trees.

Its native range is Eastern Malesia to Northern Queensland.

Species:

Ryticaryum elegans 
Ryticaryum fasciculatum 
Ryticaryum gracile 
Ryticaryum longifolium 
Ryticaryum lucidum 
Ryticaryum macrocarpum 
Ryticaryum novoguineense 
Ryticaryum oleraceum 
Ryticaryum oxycarpum 
Ryticaryum purpurascens 
Ryticaryum racemosum 
Ryticaryum rotundatum

References

Icacinaceae
Asterid genera
Dioecious plants